The following is a list of forts in Mumbai.

List

Timeline

See also
Bassein Fort
Belapur Fort
List of forts in Maharashtra

References

Mumbai
Forts
Forts
Articles which contain graphical timelines
Forts in Mumbai